BroBizz is a Danish system for electronic toll collection established in 2008.

It was developed and managed by BroBizz A/S. Meanwhile, Sund & Bælt Holding A/C own 100% of its share.

. Sund & Bælt is part of the joint venturwith e EasyGo.

BroBizz is a wireless transmitter, which allows drivers to go through automatic tollbooths without stopping.

It used on the Great Belt Fixed Link and the Øresund Bridge, as well as for payment on several ferries, toll roads, airport car parks, and parking facilities in numerous cities in Scandinavia.  AutoPASS a Norwegian company is also part of EasyGo. Therefore, BroBizz can be used on Norwegian toll roads with AutoPASS.

BroBizz A/S is the first company in Scandinavia registered as an EETS issuer.

The European Electronic Toll Service (EETS) directives purpose is that an electronic transmitter can be used for payment on all toll roads in the EU.

Since being registered as an EETS issuer by the Danish Road Directorate, negotiations with Poland and France are first on the agenda.

These are countries which BroBizz have had informal conversations with since 2016.

PayByPlate 
BroBizz A/S is introducing automatic number-plate recognition, starting 21 March 2018. With PayByPlate, it will be possible to use the number plate as identification, providing the same benefits as a BroBizz transponder. Initially, the product can only be used on the Great Belt Bridge.

PayByPlate is offered to Danish registered cars under 3,500 kg with regular number plates.

See also 
 AutoPASS
 EasyGo

References 

Payment systems
Electronic toll collection
Radio-frequency identification
Road congestion charge schemes
Wireless locating
Car costs
Road transport in Denmark
Road transport in Norway
Road transport in Sweden
Transport in the Capital Region of Denmark